Kim Min-gi (born November 22, 2002), is a South Korean actor. He is best known for his roles in True Beauty (2020), Racket Boys (2021) and Under the Queen's Umbrella (2022).

Filmography

Television series

Web series

Television shows

Awards and nominations

Notes

References

External links
Kim Min-gi at HM Entertainment

2002 births
Living people
21st-century South Korean male actors
South Korean male television actors
South Korean male web series actors
People from Chuncheon